The Consensus 1993 College Basketball All-American team, as determined by aggregating the results of four major All-American teams.  To earn "consensus" status, a player must win honors from a majority of the following teams: the Associated Press, the USBWA, The United Press International and the National Association of Basketball Coaches.

1993 Consensus All-America team

Individual All-America teams

AP Honorable Mention

Vin Baker, Hartford
Parrish Casebier, Evansville
Sam Crawford, New Mexico State
Bill Curley, Boston College
Yinka Dare, George Washington
Tony Dunkin, Coastal Carolina
Acie Earl, Iowa
Doug Edwards, Florida State
Michael Finley, Wisconsin
James Forrest, Georgia Tech
Jamie Gladden, Xavier
Greg Graham, Indiana
Brian Grant, Xavier
Josh Grant, Utah
Thomas Hill, Duke
Juwan Howard, Michigan
Bobby Hopson, Wagner
Lindsey Hunter, Jackson State
Ervin Johnson, New Orleans
Adonis Jordan, Kansas
Jason Kidd, California
Warren Kidd, Middle Tennessee State
George Lynch, North Carolina
Aaron McKie, Temple
Darnell Mee, Western Kentucky
Lawrence Moten, Syracuse
Stacey Poole, Florida
Bryant Reeves, Oklahoma State
James Robinson, Alabama
Jalen Rose, Michigan
Stevin Smith, Arizona State
Darrick Suber, Rider
Bob Sura, Florida State
Dedan Thomas, UNLV
Gary Trost, Brigham Young
Rex Walters, Kansas
Charlie Ward, Florida State

References

NCAA Men's Basketball All-Americans
All-Americans